The Pearre-Metcalfe House is a historic home located at New Windsor, Frederick County, Maryland, United States. It is a brick Greek Revival style farmhouse, built about 1859. There is a small, brick springhouse with corbeled brick cornice and tin roof on the property.

The Pearre-Metcalfe House was listed on the National Register of Historic Places in 1979.

References

External links
, including photo in 1976, at Maryland Historical Trust

Houses on the National Register of Historic Places in Maryland
Houses in Frederick County, Maryland
Houses completed in 1859
Greek Revival houses in Maryland
National Register of Historic Places in Frederick County, Maryland